Wetmore Peak is a peak (2,120 m) in the north part of Lyttelton Range, 6 nautical miles (11 km) east-northeast of Mount Bierle, in the Admiralty Mountains, Victoria Land. Mapped by United States Geological Survey (USGS) from surveys and U.S. Navy air photos, 1960–63. Named by Advisory Committee on Antarctic Names (US-ACAN) for Cliff Wetmore, United States Antarctic Research Program (USARP) biologist at Hallett Station, 1963–64.

Mountains of Victoria Land
Pennell Coast